Yellow Sands is a 1938 British comedy drama film directed by Herbert Brenon and starring Marie Tempest, Belle Chrystall, Wilfrid Lawson and Robert Newton. It was based on the 1926 play Yellow Sands by Adelaide and Eden Phillpotts.

Premise
The film is a rural comedy about a rich dying woman's relatives that are about to be disappointed by the contents of her will.

Cast
 Marie Tempest as Jennifer Varwell
 Belle Chrystall as Lydia Blake
 Wilfrid Lawson as Richard Varwell
 Robert Newton as Joe Varwell
 Patrick Barr as Arthur Varwell
 Amy Veness as Mary Varwell
 Coral Browne as Emma Copplestone
 Drusilla Wills as Minnie Masters
 Muriel Johnston as Nellie Masters
 Edward Rigby as Tom Major

References

External links

1938 films
1938 comedy-drama films
Films shot at Associated British Studios
1930s English-language films
British comedy-drama films
British black-and-white films
British films based on plays
Films directed by Herbert Brenon
1930s British films